Michael Dougals Whited (born March 30, 1958) is a former American football tackle who played for the Detroit Lions of the National Football League (NFL). He played college football at University of the Pacific. Whited also played for the Arizona Wranglers of the United States Football League (USFL).

References

Further reading
 
 

Living people
American football tackles
Pacific Tigers football players
1958 births
Players of American football from California
Detroit Lions players